was the second of four main administrative districts of the pre-war Imperial Japanese Navy. Its territory included the Inland Sea of Japan and the Pacific coasts of southern Honshū from Wakayama to Yamaguchi prefectures, eastern and northern Kyūshū and Shikoku.

The area of the Kure Naval District encompassed Hashirajima Anchoring Area located at the south end of Hiroshima Bay, 30-40 kilometers southwest of Kure. When not in need of repairs ships usually anchored in this area to free up pier space at Kure. Hashirajima was also a major staging area for fleet operations.

Tokuyama port, was also part of Kure Naval District, and had the largest fuel depot in the Japanese Navy.

History
The location of Kure within the sheltered Inland Sea of Japan was recognized of strategic importance in controlling the sea lanes around western Japan by the Meiji government and early Imperial Japanese Navy. With the formation of the navy in 1886, Japan was divided into five naval districts for recruiting and supply. During the administrative re-organization of the Japanese Navy in 1889, Kure was designated as the "Second Naval District" (第二海軍区, dai-ni kaigunku), and its harbor was dredged, a breakwater constructed and docking facilities for warships were established. The following year, work began on the Kure Naval Arsenal, which would eventually expand to become one of the largest shipyards in Japan for the construction of large capital ships. The facilities of Kure Naval District included armories, production factories for torpedoes, naval mines and naval artillery (and associated ammunition), and also a naval hospital and training centers.

The Imperial Japanese Naval Academy and Naval Staff College were relocated from Tokyo to nearby Etajima, and thus also came within the borders of the Kure Naval District, but did not come under the command of Kure Naval District itself.

In 1920, the Imperial Japanese Navy established its main submarine base and submarine warfare training school in Kure. An air wing was established in 1932, and a telecommunications center in 1937.

At the time of the attack on Pearl Harbor in 1941, Kure Naval District encompassed the following
Kure Naval District HQ
Kure Naval Base
Kure Naval Guard Unit
Destroyer Yakaze
Submarines I-52, Ro-30, Ro-31, Ro-32
Minelayer Katsuriki
Kaibokan Yakumo
Kure Naval Arsenal
Kure Naval Hospital
Kure Naval Prison
Kure Naval Fuel Deport
Kure Special Naval Landing Forces
Kure Submarine Base
Otake Naval Infantry Barracks
Tokuyama Naval Fuel Depot
Kure Security Squadron
C.M. cruiser Saigon Maru, Bangkok Maru
C.M. gunboat Hong Kong Maru
Kure Local Defence Squadron
Destroyer Division 13
Destroyer Wakatake, Kuretake, Sanae
No.13-class submarine chasers  CH-19, CH-20, CH-21 
C.M. cruiser Kinjōsan Maru
Minesweeper Division 31
C.M. minesweeper Takunan Maru No. 3, Takunan Maru No. 8, Tama Maru, Tama Maru No. 6, Tama Maru No. 7, Ōi Maru
Minesweeper Division 33
C.M. minesweeper Bizan Maru, Meshima Maru, Tokuhō Maru No. 5, Dai-2-Gō Asahi Maru, Kiri Maru No. 5, Miyo Maru
Saeki Defence Unit
Shimonoseki Defence Unit
12th Combined Air Group (training)
Ōita Naval Air Group
Usa Naval Air Group
Hakata Naval Air Group
Ōmura Naval Air Group
Kure Naval Air Group
Saeki Naval Air Group
Submarine Division Six (training)
Submarine Ro-57
Submarine Ro-58
Submarine Ro-59

Kure was heavily bombed by United States Navy and United States Army Air Forces bombers in the final stages of the Pacific War, and many of its facilities were destroyed. The Kure area came under occupation by Australian and British forces during the occupation of Japan, and was largely demilitarized. A small portion of the area continued to be occupied by the modern post-war Japanese Maritime Self-Defense Force, which has preserved a portion of the original red brick gates and couple of buildings as commemorative museums.

List of commanders

Commanding officers

Chief of Staff
 Rear-Admiral Shizuo Sato (1 April 1889 – 13 May 1890)
 Fleet Admiral Marquis Heihachiro Togo (13 May 1890 – 14 December 1891)
 Rear-Admiral Tokiyasu Yoshijima (14 December 1891 – 20 May 1893)
 Rear-Admiral Fukusaburo Hirao (20 May 1893 – 11 May 1895)
 Rear-Admiral Katsumi Miyoshi (11 May 1895 – 27 December 1897)
 Vice-Admiral Baron Masamichi Togo (27 December 1897 – 23 March 1899)
 Captain Isamu Yajima (23 March 1899 – 6 December 1900)
 Rear-Admiral Hisamaro Oinoue (6 December 1900 – 3 February 1904)
 Vice-Admiral Baron Tokutaro Nakamizo (3 February 1904 – 10 May 1905)
 Rear-Admiral Ichiro Nijima (10 May 1905 – 2 February 1906)
 Admiral Motaro Yoshimatsu (2 February 1906 – 22 November 1906)
 Rear-Admiral Shinjiro Uehara (22 November 1906 – 27 December 1907)
 Rear-Admiral Heitaro Takeuchi (27 December 1907 – 22 May 1910)
 Admiral Matahichiro Nawa (22 May 1910 – 20 April 1912)
 Admiral Kaneo Nomaguchi　(20 April 1912 – 10 January 1913)
 Rear-Admiral Kishichiro Osawa (10 January 1913 – 1 December 1913)
 Vice-Admiral Naoe Nakano (1 December 1913 – 17 April 1914)
 Admiral Kenji Ide (17 April 1914 – 13 December 1915)
 Vice-Admiral Shibakichi Yamanaka (13 December 1915 – 13 July 1917)
 Vice-Admiral Junichi Matsumura (18 July 1917 – 1 December 1918)
 Vice-Admiral Shichigoro Saito (1 December 1918 – 1 December 1920)
 Vice-Admiral Yoshimoto Masaki (1 December 1920 – 1 December 1922)
 Vice-Admiral Naomoto Komatsu (1 December 1922 – 6 November 1923)
 Vice-Admiral Naotaro Nagasawa (6 November 1923 – 1 December 1924)
 Rear-Admiral Bekinari Kabayama (1 December 1924 – 16 December 1924)
 Vice-Admiral Tokujiro Tateno (16 December 1924 – 1 December 1926)
 Vice-Admiral Kiyohiro Ijichi (1 December 1926 – 10 December 1928)
 Admiral Koshirō Oikawa (10 December 1928 – 10 June 1930)
 Vice-Admiral Giichi Suzuki (10 June 1930 – 1 December 1931)
 Vice-Admiral Choji Inoue (1 December 1931 – 15 November 1932)
 Vice-Admiral Tokutaro Sumiyama (15 November 1932 – 15 November 1934)
 Vice-Admiral Umataro Tanimoto (15 November 1934 – 15 November 1935)
 Vice-Admiral Masaichi Niimi (15 November 1935 – 1 April 1936)
 Vice-Admiral Ichiro Sato (1 April 1936 – 1 December 1936)
 Vice-Admiral Takamoto Togari (1 December 1936 – 15 December 1938)
 Vice-Admiral Toshihisa Nakamura (15 December 1938 – 10 October 1939)
 Vice-Admiral Matome Ugaki (10 October 1939 – 20 August 1941)
 Vice-Admiral Torahiko Nakajima (20 August 1941 – 6 January 1943)
 Vice-Admiral Kengo Kobayashi (6 January 1943 – 11 June 1943)
 Vice-Admiral Shinzo Onishi (11 June 1943 – 9 September 1944)
 Vice-Admiral Shozo Hashimoto (10 September 1944 – 15 October 1945)
 Rear-Admiral Tametsugu Okada (15 October 1945 – 30 November 1945)

See also
 Naval Academy Etajima
 Etajima
 Attack on Kure (March 1945)
 Attacks on Kure and the Inland Sea (July 1945)

Notes

References

Imperial Japanese Navy